In cricket, a five-wicket haul (also known as a "five–for" or "fifer") refers to a bowler taking five or more wickets in a single innings. This is regarded as a notable achievement, and as of 2014 only 42 bowlers have taken at least 15 five-wicket hauls at international level in their cricketing careers. Courtney Walsh, a former cricketer, who represented the West Indies cricket team from 1984 to 2001, took 23 five-wicket hauls in international cricket. He played 132 Tests and 205 One Day Internationals (ODIs), and took 519 and 227 wickets respectively. A right-arm fast bowler, Walsh took 22 five-wicket hauls in Tests and 1 in ODIs. In 1987, when he was named one of the Wisden Cricketers of the Year, the cricket almanack Wisden noted his "three distinct speeds, all delivered with the same action", and his "sparing use of the bouncer, his shorter deliveries generally threatening the batsman's rib-cage, a tactic which, allied to change of pace, produced many catches in the short-leg area off splice or glove." He was inducted into the ICC Cricket Hall of Fame in October 2010.

Walsh made his Test debut in November 1984 against Australia at the WACA Ground, Perth, a match West Indies won by an innings and 112 runs. His first Test five-wicket haul came in 1987 against New Zealand at the Eden Park, Auckland; the match was won by West Indies by 10 wickets. His career-best bowling figures for an innings were 7 wickets for 37 runs against the same team at the Basin Reserve, Wellington, in February 1995. He took another 6 wickets in the next innings, accumulating 13 wickets for 55 runs in the match—his solitary pair of five-wicket hauls. West Indies won the match by an innings and 322 runs, and his performance earned him a man of the match award. Walsh took more five-wicket hauls against England than any other nation: five. He took ten or more wickets in a match on three occasions.

Walsh made his ODI debut during the 1984–85 World Series Cup against Sri Lanka at the Tasmania Cricket Association Ground, Hobart. His solitary ODI five-wicket haul came against the same team in December 1986, a match which West Indies won at the Sharjah Cricket Association Stadium, Sharjah by 193 runs. He took five wickets conceding one run in the match. ESPNcricinfo declared that it was the "cheapest" five-wicket haul in the history of international cricket. As of 2014, he is sixteenth among all-time combined five-wicket haul takers.

Key

Tests

One Day Internationals

Notes

References

External links
 
 

West Indian cricket lists
Walsh, Courtney